Ann Margaret Griffiths (née Williams; born 20 August 1965) is a retired English athlete who competed in middle-distance events. In the 800 meters, she won a silver medal at the 1990 Commonwealth Games and finished seventh in the final at the 1991 World Championships, before going on to represent Great Britain in the 1500 metres at the 1992 Summer Olympics in Barcelona.

Career
A member of Sale Harriers Manchester athletics club, Williams won a silver medal for England in the 800 metres, at the 1990 Commonwealth Gamesin Auckland, New Zealand, in a race that was a one-two for the club, with the winner being Diane Edwards.

Williams ran under two minutes for 800m for the first time, when running 1:59.88 for fourth at the 1991 Europa Cup, to become the sixth British woman to break the two-minute barrier (after Christina Boxer, Shireen Bailey, Kirsty McDermott, Lorraine Baker and Diane Edwards). Two months later she reached the final at the 1991 World Championships in Tokyo, finishing seventh.

Williams achieved her career-best 1500m time of 4:07.59 when winning at the Golden Gala Rome Grand Prix on 9 June 1992. At the 1992 Barcelona Olympics she fell in her qualifying heat and was unfortunate to be disqualified.

Now competing under her married name Ann Griffiths, she achieved her career-best at 800m, running 1:59.81 for fifth in the final at the 1994 European Championships.

International competitions

National titles
UK Championships 800 metres (1989)
AAA Championships 800 metres (1990)
AAA Championships 1500 metres (1991)

Personal bests
Outdoor
800 metres – 1:59.81 (Helsinki 1994)
1500 metres – 4:07.59 (Rome 1992)
Indoor
1000 metres – 2:40.07 (Birmingham 1996)
1500 metres – 4:16.25 (Birmingham 1996)

References

All-Athletics profile

Living people
1965 births
Sportspeople from St Helens, Merseyside
English female middle-distance runners
Olympic athletes of Great Britain
Athletes (track and field) at the 1992 Summer Olympics
Commonwealth Games medallists in athletics
Commonwealth Games silver medallists for England
Athletes (track and field) at the 1990 Commonwealth Games
World Athletics Championships athletes for Great Britain
Medallists at the 1990 Commonwealth Games